Zombie Night may refer to the following:
 Zombie Night (2003 film), a 2003 zombie film by David J. Francis
 Zombie Night (2013 film), a 2013 zombie film by John Gulager

See also 
 Zombie Night 2: Awakening
 Silent Night, Zombie Night